Dyer v Dyer [1788] EWHC Exch J8, (1788) 2 Cox  Eq Cas 92 is an English trusts law case which held that where property is purchased by one person in the name of another there is the presumption of a resulting trust.

Facts
A person provided money to purchase a legal estate in land in the name of another person, and there was no evidence that the purchaser intended to advance a loan or make a gift. It was therefore assumed that the legal title holder holds the property on resulting trust for the person who provided the funds.

Judgment
Eyre CB stated "the trust of a legal estate, whether freehold, copyhold, or leasehold; whether taken in the names of the purchasers and other jointly, or in the names of others without that of the purchaser; whether in the one name or several; whether jointly or successive - results to the man who advances the purchase-money".

See also
English property law

Notes

References

English property case law
1788 in case law
1788 in Great Britain
Exchequer of Pleas cases